Michael Jordan (born October 21, 1992) is a former American football cornerback. He played college football at Missouri Western State. He signed with the Los Angeles Rams as an undrafted free agent in 2016 and has also played for the Cleveland Browns and New York Giants.

Professional career

Los Angeles Rams
Jordan was signed as an undrafted free agent with the Los Angeles Rams after going undrafted in the 2016 NFL Draft. On September 3, 2016, he was waived by the Rams as part of final roster cuts. The next day, he was signed to the Rams' practice squad. He was promoted to the active roster on November 22, 2016.

On September 2, 2017, Jordan was waived by the Rams.

Cleveland Browns
On September 3, 2017, Jordan was claimed off waivers by the Cleveland Browns.

On September 1, 2018, Jordan was waived by the Browns.

New York Giants
On September 2, 2018, Jordan was claimed off waivers by the New York Giants. He was waived on October 30, 2018.

Tennessee Titans
On November 13, 2018, Jordan was signed to the Tennessee Titans practice squad. He signed a reserve/future contract with the Titans on December 31, 2018. He was waived on August 31, 2019.

References

External links
 Missouri Western Griffons bio

1992 births
Living people
African-American players of American football
American football cornerbacks
Cleveland Browns players
Los Angeles Rams players
Missouri Western Griffons football players
New York Giants players
Players of American football from Missouri
Sportspeople from St. Louis County, Missouri
Tennessee Titans players
21st-century African-American sportspeople